The 1999 Tipperary Senior Hurling Championship was the 109th staging of the Tipperary Senior Hurling Championship since its establishment by the Tipperary County Board in 1887. The championship began on 28 August 1999 and ended on 10 October 1999.

Toomevara were the defending champions.

On 10 October 1999, Toomevara won the championship after a 1-17 to 0-13 defeat of Nenagh Éire Óg  in the final at Semple Stadium. It was their 15th championship title overall and their second title in succession.

Results

Quarter-finals

Semi-finals

Final

Championship statistics

Top scorers

Top scorers overall

Top scorers in a single game

References

External link

 The County Senior Hurling Championship - 1999

Tipperary
Tipperary Senior Hurling Championship